The crested guineafowl (Guttera sp.) are a group of three species and members of the Numididae, the guineafowl bird family. They are found in open forest, woodland and forest-savanna mosaics in sub-Saharan Africa.

Description
They have a total length around 50 cm (20 in) and weigh . The plumage is overall blackish with dense white spots. They have  distinctive black crests on the top of their heads, the form of which varies from small curly feathers to down depending upon subspecies, and which easily separates them from all other species of guineafowl, except the plumed guineafowl. The names "crested" and "plumed" are often misapplied across the species.

Breeding
They are monogamous with probable strong and long-lasting pair bonds. Courtship feeding is common, the author having seen a captive male run 5–10 m to the hen to present some particular morsel. The nest is a well-hidden scrape in long grass or under a bush; eggs vary from nearly white to buff and a clutch is usually around four or five.

Intraspecific taxonomy

The intraspecific taxonomy of the crested guineafowl has been subject to considerable debate, but most recent authorities accept five subspecies across three species. (e.g. I. Martinez in Handbook of the Birds of the World [HBW], 1994). Visual differences between the subspecies, in addition to the form of the crest, are in the colour and position of any patches on the otherwise grey-blue neck and face. Such patches vary from almost white to yellow, to red. The pucherani species is found in East Africa from Somalia to Tanzania, and is distinctive with a grey-blue neck and extensive red to the face. The southern crested guineafowl, in which case the remaining subspecies, which are found in southern, central, and west Africa under the scientific name Guttera edouardi. They have a bluish face and neck, though the nape is very pale greyish (almost white) in some subspecies and the throat is red in others. In 2022, Clements and the IUCN have split the species into three, with the nominate being called eastern crested guineafowl, subspecies sclateri and verreauxi being called western crested guineafowl, and edouardi and Barbara being called southern crested guineafowl. In 2023, the IOCfollowed suit.

Subspecies
The recognized subspecies are:
 Southern crested guineafowl, Guttera edouardi
 G. e. edouardi barbata (Ghigi, 1905) – Malawi crested guineafowl – southeastern Tanzania to eastern Mozambique and Malawi
 G. e.. edouardi (Hartlaub, 1867) - Edward's crested guineafowl – eastern Zambia to Mozambique and eastern South Africa
 Eastern crested guineafowl, Guttera pucherani G. p. pucherani (Hartlaub, 1861) – Kenya crested guineafowl – Somalia to Tanzania, Zanzibar, and Tumbatu Island
 Western crested guineafowl, Guttera verreauxi G. v. sclateri (Reichenow, 1898) – Sclater's crested guineafowl – northwestern Cameroon
 G. v. verreauxi'' (Elliot, 1870) – Lindi crested guineafowl – Guinea-Bissau to western Kenya, Angola, and Zambia

References

crested guineafowl